Allelujah! Don't Bend! Ascend! (sometimes stylized in all caps) is the fourth studio album by Canadian post-rock band Godspeed You! Black Emperor, released by Constellation Records. It was their first album since 2002's Yanqui U.X.O.. After reforming in 2010, the group went on tour and silently released the album at a concert in Boston on October 1, 2012, with official release dates on October 15 in Europe and the following day in other countries. The album received positive reviews and has been heralded as a comeback for the collective, winning the 2013 Polaris Music Prize.

The album marked the beginning of a major stylistic change for Godspeed You! Black Emperor, being less technically complex and emphasizing further on drones while abandoning the concept of movements altogether – a compositional format they would continue to employ until 2021's G_d's Pee at State's End!.

Reception

Allelujah! Don't Bend! Ascend! received positive reviews from critics. Eli Kleman of Sputnikmusic stated that the album has "immeasurable breadth and depth" and is a "truly unforgettable experience". Drowned in Sounds Andrzej Lukowski said that the release is "a modestly magnificent record that entirely validates" the band reforming. Mark Richardson of Pitchfork also draws a connection between the group's entire output, finishing his review by calling this "an album of music that is both new and old from a band that we thought we might never hear from again, one we should appreciate while we can". Tyler Kane of Paste gave the album an 8.9 out of 10, writing that, "the time-tested tracks not only showcase the band doing what they do best in notoriously long, dramatic, panic-inducing instrumentals but are also startling reminders on why the band was so vital and lead such a movement to begin with". The Guardians Dom Lawson gave the album 5 out of 5 stars, because "the Godspeed ethos of wordlessly eliciting universal truths remains as devastatingly effective as ever".

The album was listed 13th on Stereogum's list of top 50 albums of 2012.

The album won the 2013 Polaris Music Prize on September 23, 2013.

Track listing
The vinyl edition of the album packages the lengthier tracks "Mladic" and "We Drift Like Worried Fire" on a 12" LP accompanied by a 7" featuring the shorter, "drone" tracks "Their Helicopters Sing" and "Strung Like Lights at Thee Printemps Erable". On the 12"'s inner sleeve there are instructions regarding which order the sides are to be played as this differs from most vinyl albums. The vinyl track listing is, in fact: A1 ("Mladic"), B1 ("Their Helicopters Sing"), A2 ("We Drift Like Worried Fire") and B2 ("Strung Like Lights at Thee Printemps Erable"). The CD edition of the album compiles all four tracks on a single disc. "Mladic" and "We Drift Like Worried Fire" are re-workings of previously unreleased live tracks formerly known as "Albanian" and "Gamelan", which have been performed live as far back as 2003.

Compact Disc
"Mladic" – 20:18
"Their Helicopters' Sing" – 6:45
"We Drift Like Worried Fire" – 20:30
"Strung Like Lights at Thee Printemps Erable" – 6:47

12" (A)
"Mladic" – 19:53
"We Drift Like Worried Fire" – 19:57

7" (B)
"Their Helicopters' Sing" – 6:24
"Strung Like Lights at Thee Printemps Erable" – 6:25

Personnel
Godspeed You! Black Emperor
Thierry Amar – bass guitar, double bass, cello, recording and mixing on "Their Helicopters Sing" and "Strung Like Lights at Thee Printemps Erable"
David Bryant – electric guitar, hammered dulcimer, Portasound, kemençe, recording and mixing on "Their Helicopters Sing" and "Strung Like Lights at Thee Printemps Erable", photography
Bruce Cawdron – drums, vibraphone, marimba, glockenspiel
Aidan Girt – drums
Karl Lemieux – 16 mm frames artwork, photography
Efrim Menuck – electric guitar, hurdy-gurdy, recording and mixing on "Their Helicopters Sing" and "Strung Like Lights at Thee Printemps Erable", photography
Mike Moya – electric guitar, recording and mixing on "Their Helicopters Sing" and "Strung Like Lights at Thee Printemps Erable"
Mauro Pezzente – bass guitar
Sophie Trudeau – violin, Casio SK-5

Technical personnel
Howard Bilerman – recording on "Mladic" and "We Drift Like Worried Fire"
Charles-André Coderre – cover photo
Yannick Grandmont – photography
Timothy Herzog – "Atonal Canada" photo
Harris Newman at Greymarket – mastering

Charts

References

External links
Press release
Stream of the album

2012 albums
Albums produced by Howard Bilerman
Constellation Records (Canada) albums
Godspeed You! Black Emperor albums
Instrumental rock albums
Polaris Music Prize-winning albums